Holly's Heroes is a children's drama series produced as a collaboration between the Nine Network in Australia and TVNZ in New Zealand. It was produced as a series of 26 episodes and first screened in 2005.

Plot summary
Holly McKenzie is a 14-year-old New Zealander who moves to the Australian seaside town of Woolich with her family. When her dreams of playing basketball with the local team the "Rams" are quickly shattered, Holly is determined to prove her ability by forming her own team, the "Outlaws".

Cast
Dominique Crawford as Holly McKenzie
Kane McNay as Nick Fraser
 Greta Larkins as Jacinta Peterson
 Jared Daperis as Ralph Owen
Michael Harrison as Johnno Walsh
 Jessie Jacobs as Emily Walsh
 Ben Schumann as Franco Galluzo
 John Williams as Parker
 Nicholas Colla as Joel Peterson
 Virginia Ryan as Patricia “Trish” Jenkins
 Stephany Avila as Eleanor 'Scubi' Scubinski
 David Roberts as Alan Peterson
 Kirk Torrance as Tony McKenzie
 Michele Amas as Kate McKenzie
 Alan Hopgood as Max Peterson
Dwayne Abeyesekera as Singh
Anna Gelling as Monique
Naomi Davis as Flower
Pamela Rabe as Mrs Racacelli
Virginia Wickham as Sandy
Thomas Blackbule as Mitch
Carolyn Bock as Mayor
Anne Cordineras Doctor Murphy
Anna McCrossin-Owen as Judy
Daniel Bernard as M.Pizza
Nicholas Bell as Mr. Craword
Paris Dagres as Briana
Taneora Herbert-Kaiwai as Watene

See also
 List of Australian television series

References

External links
Holly's Heroes at IMDb
Holly's Heroes at Australian Television
 Holly's Heroes at ninemsn

2005 Australian television series debuts
2005 New Zealand television series debuts
2005 New Zealand television series endings
2005 Australian television series endings
Australian children's television series
New Zealand children's television series
Nine Network original programming
TVNZ 2 original programming
Television series about teenagers
Television shows funded by NZ on Air